Joseph William Baker (born September 9, 2000) is an American college basketball player for the Michigan Wolverines of the Big Ten Conference. He previously played for the Duke Blue Devils of the Atlantic Coast Conference (ACC). He was a four-star recruit in high school and the number 3 player in North Carolina according to ESPN.

High school career
Baker attended Trinity Christian School in Fayetteville, North Carolina.

Recruiting
Baker was a four-star recruit and one of the top players in the 2019 class, before reclassifying to the 2018 class.

College career

Duke (2018–2022)
On October 29, 2017, Baker committed to playing college basketball for the Duke Blue Devils over offers from Kansas, Tennessee and UCLA. Baker would join a recruiting class that featured future NBA players RJ Barrett, Cam Reddish, and Zion Williamson, as well as Tre Jones for the 2018–19 Duke Blue Devils men's basketball team. During his freshman year, Baker was set to redshirt for the entire season, until Coach K put him into the game against Syracuse on February 23, 2019.

In his sophomore season, Baker put up a career high in points scored with 22 against the Wofford Terriers on December 19, 2019.

On May 8, 2022, Baker completed his undergraduate degree in Political Science and graduated from Duke University.

Michigan (2022–present)
On June 18, 2022, Baker transferred to the University of Michigan as a graduate transfer for his final year of college basketball eligibility. During the offseason Baker had offseason hip surgery. Baker didn't celebrate Senior night with the 2021-22 Duke Blue Devils, because he anticipated playing his fifth year there, but he did celebrate it with the 2022–23 Michigan Wolverines on February 26 against Wisconsin. In the opening round of the 2023 National Invitation Tournament, against Toledo on March 14, 2023, Baker posted season-highs in points (21), field goals made (eight), and three-pointers made (five) on 8–11 shooting. Following the game, he announced that he was pursuing a retroactive redshirt from his freshman season for the 2018-19 Duke Blue Devils.

Career statistics

College

|-
| style="text-align:left;"|2018–19
| style="text-align:left;"|Duke
| 4 || 0 || 4.5 || .250 || .500 || .000 || 1.0 || 0.0 || 0.0 || 0.3 || 0.8
|-
| style="text-align:left;"|2019–20
| style="text-align:left;"|Duke
| 28 || 3 || 12.1 || .410 || .394 || .917 || 0.9 || 0.8 || 0.5 || 0.2 || 5.0
|-
| style="text-align:left;"|2020–21
| style="text-align:left;"|Duke
| 23 || 1 || 11.5 || .310 || .314 || .750 || 1.2 || 0.4 || 0.3 || 0.3 || 2.9
|-
| style="text-align:left;"|2021–22
| style="text-align:left;"|Duke
| 34 || 0 || 11.9 || .432 || .405 || .778 || 1.2 || 0.4 || 0.4 || 0.0 || 4.5
|-
| style="text-align:left;"|2022–23
| style="text-align:left;"|Michigan
| 32 || 3 || 15.6 || .373 || .380 || .633 || 2.2 || 0.4 || 0.3 || 0.3 || 5.1
|- class="sortbottom"
| style="text-align:center;" colspan="2"| Career
| 121 || 7 || 12.6 || .387 || .379 || .740 || 1.4 || 0.5 || 0.4 || 0.2 || 4.3

Personal life
His father, Michael Baker, served in the United States Army.

References

External links
Duke Blue Devils bio
Michigan Wolverines bio
ESPN profile

2000 births
Living people
American men's basketball players
Basketball players from North Carolina
Duke Blue Devils men's basketball players
Michigan Wolverines men's basketball players
Small forwards
Sportspeople from Fayetteville, North Carolina